Give More Love is the 19th studio album by English musician Ringo Starr. It was recorded primarily in Starr's home studio in Los Angeles and was released on 15 September 2017 by UM. The album features Starr's frequent collaborators such as Joe Walsh, Dave Stewart, Gary Nicholson and Bob Malone, members of his All-Starr Band, and guest appearances by Starr's former Beatles bandmate Paul McCartney.

Background 
Starr began working on the album following the release of Postcards from Paradise and a tour with his All-Starr Band. Starr initially recruited longtime collaborator David A. Stewart to help him produce a country album in Nashville, but ultimately ended up recording mostly rock tracks in his home studio. The album features a number of Starr's regular collaborators, including former and current All-Starr band members Steve Lukather, Peter Frampton, Joe Walsh, Edgar Winter and Timothy B. Schmit.

Starr's former Beatles bandmate Paul McCartney plays bass on two tracks and sings backing vocals. Starr announced McCartney's appearance on the album via Twitter.

The album consists of ten new original tracks and four bonus tracks; the bonus tracks are all re-recordings of songs previously released by Starr. The re-recording of Starr's 1972 single "Back Off Boogaloo" is based on Starr's original demo of the song and features Electric Light Orchestra founder Jeff Lynne and Eagles member Joe Walsh on guitar. The re-recording of "You Can't Fight Lightning" from Stop and Smell the Roses features the Swedish band Alberta Cross, and the re-recordings of Starr's song "Photograph" and his Beatles song "Don't Pass Me By" feature the American band Vandaveer.

Starr officially announced the album on 7 July 2017, his 77th birthday, and simultaneously released the title track as a single via streaming services and digital download. "We're on the Road Again", featuring McCartney, Lukather, Walsh and Winter, was released as a second single on 18 July. The country track "So Wrong for So Long" was released as a single on 18 August. "Standing Still" was released as the final single on 8 September.

Release and reception

Give More Love received mixed reviews upon its release. Rolling Stones Will Hermes described Starr as "rock's mischievously minimalist id and Eternal-Optimist Emeritus", and called the album "a well-timed all-star candygram". AllMusic's Stephen Thomas Erlewine wrote "this isn't the kind of album that plays its cards close to the vest; as the title suggests, this is open-hearted, kind music."

Track listing

Personnel 

 Ringo Starr – vocals, percussion , drums , guitar , piano , production, mixing
 Steve Lukather – guitar , keyboards , backing vocals 
 Joe Walsh – guitar , backing vocals 
 Peter Frampton – guitar , backing vocals 
 Greg Leisz – guitar 
 Steve Dudas – guitar 
 David A. Stewart – guitar 
 Gary Nicholson – guitar 
 Jeff Lynne – guitar 
 Petter Ericson Stakee – guitar , backing vocals , percussion 
 Matthew Pynn – guitar 
 J. Tom Hnatow – guitar 
 Mark Charles Heidinger – guitar , bass , vocals 
 Jim Cox – keyboards , piano , organ 
 Benmont Tench – keyboards 
 Edgar Winter – piano , saxophone , backing vocals 
 Glen Ballard – keyboards , backing vocals 
 Bob Malone – piano 
 Paul McCartney – bass , backing vocals 
 Nathan East – bass 
 Don Was – bass 
 Matt Bissonette – bass 
 Erik MacQueen – bass 
 Fredrik Aspelin – drums , percussion 
 Robby Cosenza – drums , percussion , harmonica 
 Bruce Sugar – drum programming , keyboards ; recording, mixing, editing
 Gregg Bissonette – percussion 
 Timothy B. Schmit – backing vocals 
 Richard Page – backing vocals 
 Amy Keys – backing vocals 
 Windy Wagner – backing vocals 
 Gary Burr – backing vocals , guitar 
 Georgia Middleman – backing vocals 
 Rose Guerin – vocals 
 Viktor Buck – backing vocals ; engineering (13)
 Fred Appelquist – engineering (13)
 Peter R. Ericson – additional production (13)
 Duane Lundy – additional engineering & production (21)

Charts

References

External links

2017 albums
Ringo Starr albums
Universal Music Enterprises albums
Albums produced by Ringo Starr